Stadt Wehlen (also: Wehlen) is a town in the Sächsische Schweiz-Osterzgebirge district, in Saxony, Germany. It is situated on the western edge of Saxon Switzerland, on the right bank of the Elbe, 6 km east of Pirna, and 23 km southeast of Dresden (centre).

Municipality subdivisions
Wehlen includes the following subdivisions:
 Dorf Wehlen
 Pötzscha
 Stadt Wehlen
 Zeichen

Culture and attractions in Wehlen

Transport 
Stadt Wehlen station, on the Dresden S-Bahn and the Dresden to Prague railway, is located on the south bank of the Elb and is connected to the town centre, on the north bank, by the frequent Stadt Wehlen passenger ferry. Also on the north bank, an infrequent bus service connects the town to Pirna. Both ferry and bus are operated by the Regionalverkehr Sächsische Schweiz-Osterzgebirge. Königstein is also a stop for the Sächsische Dampfschiffahrt ships, including historic paddle steamers, operating on the Elbe between Dresden and the Czech border.

International relations

Stadt Wehlen is twinned with:
 Wehlen an der Mosel (Rhineland-Palatinate)
 Wangen im Allgäu (Baden-Württemberg
 Dorn-Dürkheim 
 Trochtelfingen

See also 
 Bergtest near Wehlen, an annual competition walk.

References

External links
 Webpage of the town of wehlen
 Tourist information of the town of wehlen

Populated places in Saxon Switzerland